Frederick Harold Norris (14 August 1903 — September 1962) was an English footballer who played as an inside forward.

Career
Norris began his career at Birmingham Victorian League side Adelaide, later joining Halesowen Town. In February 1926, Norris signed for Aston Villa. Norris made nine Football League appearances at Aston Villa, scoring twice. In 1928, Norris signed for West Ham United. Over the course of five seasons at the club, Norris made 65 appearances, scoring six times, all in the league. In 1933, Norris signed for Crystal Palace. Norris made twelve appearances at the club, scoring four times. Norris later emigrated to France.

References

1903 births
1962 deaths
Association football forwards
English footballers
Footballers from Birmingham, West Midlands
Halesowen Town F.C. players
Aston Villa F.C. players
West Ham United F.C. players
Crystal Palace F.C. players
English expatriate footballers
English expatriate sportspeople in France
Expatriate footballers in France
English Football League players